Tzvelevopyrethrum is a genus of flowering plants belonging to the family Asteraceae.

It is native to Iran and Turkmenistan.

Known species
According to Kew:
 Tzvelevopyrethrum khorassanicum (Krasch.) Kamelin 
 Tzvelevopyrethrum turcomanicum (Krasch.) Kamelin 
 Tzvelevopyrethrum walteri (C.Winkl.) Kamelin 

The genus name of Tzvelevopyrethrum is in honour of Nikolai Tzvelev (1925–2015), a Russian botanist and specialist in grasses and ferns. 
It was first described and published in Opred. Rast. Sred. Azii Vol.10 on page 635 in 1993.

References

Anthemideae
Asteraceae genera
Plants described in 1993
Flora of Iran
Flora of Turkmenistan